Ehsanabad may refer to:
 Ehsanabad, North Khorasan